Kvitsøy is an island municipality in Rogaland county, Norway. At only , it is the smallest municipality in Norway by area and one of the smallest by population. Kvitsøy is located in the traditional district of Ryfylke. The administrative centre of the municipality is the village of Ydstebøhamn on the island of Kvitsøy. The municipality is an archipelago located at the entrance to the large Boknafjorden. The Rogfast tunnel is being built to eventually connect Kvitsøy to the mainland road network.

The  municipality is the 356th largest by area out of the 356 municipalities in Norway, making it the smallest in the nation. Kvitsøy is the 349th most populous municipality in Norway with a population of 523.

General information
The islands of Kvitsøy were established as a municipality on 1 January 1923 when they were separated from the municipality of Mosterøy. Initially, the municipality had 581 residents. The municipal boundaries have not changed since that time.

Name
The Old Norse form of the name was Hvítingsøy(jar) which means "the white island(s)", probably because there is white quartz in the rocks on the islands. Originally, the spelling of the municipality was "Kvitingsø", but later it was shortened to "Kvitsøy".

Coat of arms
The coat of arms was granted in 1989. The arms show three silver lighthouses on a field of blue. The choice of lighthouses and the color blue are symbolic of the importance of the sea for this island municipality.

Churches
The Church of Norway has one parish within the municipality of Kvitsøy. It is part of the Tungenes prosti (deanery) in the Diocese of Stavanger.

History
Kvitsøy is first mentioned in the Snorre Saga, where Snorre records a truce being made between King Olaf II of Norway later to be known as St. Olav and Erling Skjalgsson, under the stone cross. Later it seems that the islands were owned by the Church until the reformation in 1536 (when the nation switched from Roman Catholicism to Lutheranism), when it became Crown property. In 1591, the population had become large enough to fund the construction of the Kvitsøy Church, which is still standing and the first new church in the county after the reformation. From the mid-18th century, Kvitsøy was the location of one of the first navigation beacons in western Norway, and this was later converted to a lighthouse service when the Kvitsøy Lighthouse was built. Kvitsøy Vessel Traffic Service Centre opened on 3 January 2003.

Transmitter
Kvitsøy used to be the site of high power short wave and medium wave broadcasting transmitters of the national broadcasting company, NRK. The aerial tower of the medium-wave transmitter is the Kvitsøy Tower. The transmitter for the medium-wave channel 1314 kHz was switched off at 22:00 UTC (Midnight local time) on Friday June 30, 2006, shortwave broadcasts continued until 2011. In May and June 2012, the entire site was dismantled.

Government
All municipalities in Norway, including Kvitsøy, are responsible for primary education (through 10th grade), outpatient health services, senior citizen services, unemployment and other social services, zoning, economic development, and municipal roads. The municipality is governed by a municipal council of elected representatives, which in turn elect a mayor.  The municipality falls under the Sør-Rogaland District Court and the Gulating Court of Appeal.

Municipal council
The municipal council of Kvitsøy is made up of 17 representatives that are elected to four year terms. Currently, the party breakdown is as follows:

Geography
The municipality is an archipelago located at the entrance to the large Boknafjorden. The largest island is Kvitsøy, and it is connected with a few of the other islands in the archipelago, but most of the islands are uninhabited.

Nature

Climate
The islands are completely engulfed by the Gulf Stream and hence have a typically wet West Nordic coastal climate. The sea between the islands and the mainland is never frozen. Winter highs usually are in the mid-single digits in all of the Greater Stavanger region.

Fauna and flora
There are no larger mammals in Kvitsøy except for seals (kobbe) and small dolphins (nise). The islands have a rich marine bird life. Many different plants are found on the islands. Some are natural to Norwegian flora, while others have been transported by ships emptying their hulls of ballast before entering the port of the nearby city of Stavanger.

References

External links

Municipal fact sheet from Statistics Norway 

 
Municipalities of Rogaland
1923 establishments in Norway